Luidia australiae, the southern sand star, is a species of starfish in the family Luidiidae. It is found in the Pacific Ocean around Australia and New Zealand.

Description
Luidia australiae has a variable number of long, slim, tapering arms but seven is the most common number. The central disc and the arms are a dull yellow colour, irregularly blotched with dark green or black.

Distribution and habitat
Luidia australiae is native to the waters around southern Australia and New Zealand. It is sometimes washed ashore after storms.

Biology
Luidia australiae is a carnivore and is often found half-buried in the sediment in seagrass beds where its colouring provides camouflage. It is likely to be an opportunist predator of macrofauna, and possibly also a scavenger.

References

Luidia
Animals described in 1920
Fauna of the Pacific Ocean
Taxa named by Ludwig Heinrich Philipp Döderlein